Kyagar Tso or Kyagar Lake is a small brackish lake surrounded by mountains situated in the Ladakh region of the northern Indian Union Territory of Ladakh in India. From afar, it can be spotted by its turquoise colour.

Geography 
It lies in the Rupshu Valley in Ladakh at the height of over saltwater lakes at 4,663m above sea level. It lies midway between Manali in Himachal Pradesh to Leh in Jammu and Kashmir.

Tourism 
It is observed that there are some bird species in this area.

See also 

 Saline Lake
 Aksai Chin and its locations
 Sirijap
 Khurnak Fort
 Rudok
 Spanggur Tso
 Tso Moriri

References 

Lakes of Ladakh
Lakes of Tibet
China–India border
International lakes of Asia
Tourism in Ladakh
Geography of Ladakh